Liješće is a settlement in Croatia, part of the Ozalj municipality in Karlovac County. It is located on the Slovene-Croatian border and is surrounded by the Slovene settlements of Malo Lešče, Brezovica pri Metliki and Bojanja vas. As of 2011, the population of Liješće was 37.

References

Populated places in Karlovac County